Dilhani Ashokamala Ekanayake (born 4 March 1970) is an actress in Sri Lankan cinema, theater and television. One of the most popular film actresses in Sinhala cinema, Ekanayake has won several awards as the most popular actress in multiple times.

Personal life

Ekanayake studied at St Clare's girls school, in Colombo. She is married to singer and actor Priyankara Perera son of singer Milton Perera. She has a son, Dilmin Perera.

In late 2020, her husband Priyankara was diagnosed with a kidney failure. He was hospitalized and need to undertake a kidney transplant with an A + or O + type kidney.

Career
Before entering cinema, she acted in few ballets such as Vishwa Geethaya and Saama. In 1987, along with Channa Wijewardena, she performed the ballet Ukussa. Ekanayake made her cinema debut in 1991 film Dedunnen Samanaliyak directed by Yasapalitha Nanayakkara. In that year, she won the Sarasaviya award for the Best Upcoming Actress. In 1992, she won the award for the Most Popular Actress at the same festival.

Her early roles were confined to commercial films. Her ability to dance and her trade mark smile captivated the audiences. She is known as the Sridevi of Sri Lanka. Her career hit a different trail with her role as an abandoned Tamil girl in the film Me Mage Sandai by Asoka Handagama. This serious role paved the way for other remarkable performances in Sudu Kalu Saha Alu (Shades of Grey), Mage Wam Atha (My Left Hand) and Sulanga (Wind). In 2005, she again won the award for the Best Actress for the role Sudu Kalu Saha Alu at Sarasaviya Festival. In 2007, she won Presidential award for the Best Actress for the role in Sulanga.

Also she made some notable roles in Mage Wam atha, Sulanga, Me Mage Sandai, Sudu Kalu Saha Alu, Pem Kekula, Nilambare, Gamani and many comedy films such as Cheriyo Darling, Chaya Maya etc.

Though cited as a cinema actress, she has also starred in several teledramas of which Maya Ranga, Swarna Kingkini, Meeduma, Sath Sanda Kirana and Amarapuraya stand out. She plays a major role in the Sri Lankan movie star show Ridee Reyak, which is a very popular annual event in Sri Lanka. She also performed as a judge of Ranawiru Real Star and Mega Star as well. Her latest performance came through in Dhawala Doowili, Bharyawo, and Deviya Sugala teledramas.

She has been a brand ambassador for Lux.

Awards

Sarasaviya Awards

|-
|| 1991 ||| Dedunnen Samanaliyak || Best Upcoming Actress || 
|-
|| 1992 |||  || Most popular Actress || 
|-
|| 2002 |||  || Merit Award || 
|-
|| 2002 ||| All performances of the year || Special Jury Award || 
|-
|| 2005 ||| Sudu Kalu Saha Alu || Best Actress ||

Presidential Film Awards

|-
|| 2001 ||| Me Mage Sandai || Best Actress || 
|-
|| 2005 ||| Sulanga || Best Actress ||

Signis Salutation Awards

|-
|| 2001 ||| Me Mage Sandai || Silver Performance (Female) || 
|-
|| 2012 ||| Gamani || Gold Performance (Female) ||

Derana Film Awards

|-
|| 2012 ||| Gamani || Best Actress || 
|-
|| 2015 ||| People's vote || Most popular Actress || 
|-
|| 2018 ||| Dharmayuddhaya || Best Actress ||

Filmography

References

External links 

Official Website - National Film Corporation of Sri Lanka
දිල්හානි රංජන්ගේ අම්මා වෙලා - Dilhani Ekanayake
සැබෑ මවගේ ගුණය කොතනත් එකයි

Living people
Sri Lankan film actresses
1973 births
20th-century Sri Lankan actresses
21st-century Sri Lankan actresses
People from Colombo
Sinhalese actresses